Davor Slamnig (born 13 March 1956 in Zagreb) is a Croatian writer and musician.

Biography

Slamnig was born on 13 March 1956 in Zagreb, where he finished his primary education as well as graduated from grammar school. He allegedly never finished his musical education as well as his studies at the Faculty of Philosophy of the University of Zagreb. He attended further education in the US, in Bloomington, Indiana and in Chicago.

Writing career

Slamnig's writing attempts became more serious in 1977, when he started publishing his short stories in youth periodicals, mainly in Polet. Those stories were re-published in the collection Čudovište (Monster) in 1980.

The next three years he continued publishing short stories, gathered into a second collection, "Qwertzu i Opš" in 1983. After that book came out, a long period of literary silence ensued.

Slamnig resuscitated as an author in 2002, when he published the novel Topli zrak (Hot Air). That was the first printed "long-playing" effort by the Zagreb author that sparked a great interest among the public, and which was awarded Jutarnji list'''s First Prize. The novel entered the finals of the Bosnian prize Meša Selimović.

Slamnig returned to the short story format (or, at least, to collecting them into a book) in 2005 with the title Krumpirova rodbina (Potato's Kin). The collection contained works published from 1986 until 2005. He was presented with awards for two of the short stories from that book, "Teletabisi" ("Teletubbies") and "Kak smo postali Dalmatinci" ("How We All Became Dalmatians"), with the Second Prize of Večernji list in 2004, and with the Prize Ranko Marinković and the Prize of Večernji list in 2006 respectively.

In 2011 Slamnig published a short story "Meaning" ("Smisao") in the May/June 2010 International Science Fiction issue of the World Literature Today (WLT) magazine.

Musical career

At the same time Slamnig pursued a musical career.

His first published song was "Debil Blues", written together with Goran "Pipo" Pavelić, the first playable and singable comic, drawn by the then informal leader of the Zagreb comic group Novi Kvadrat, Mirko Ilić.

In 1979 Slamnig joined the Slovenian cult band Buldožer as a guitarist. As member of the band he played and sang on their 1980 album Izlog jeftinih slatkiša. It was an important album for the group, that was left without one of the key members and authors, Marko Brecelj who left not long ago. Apart from playing the guitar, Slamnig co-authored the songs "Karlo", "Slovinjak punk" and "Žene i muškarci", the latter being called a hit single by band-members: Slamnig also delivered Brecelj's poem "Okrutni bogovi istoka". Slamnig did not remain a member of Buldožer for a long time, which comes not as a surprise regarding the fact that he lived in Zagreb, and the rest of the band in Slovenia.

Slamnig gathered his own band with Žarko Mandić on bass and Radovan Lučić on drums, while the vocal duties were delegated to the then leading Zagreb actress Mira Furlan. The album  Mira Furlan i Orkestar Davora Slamniga was recorded in Ljubljana at the end of 1982, and it was published by in Maribor by Helidon, where Boris Bele, the leader of Buldožer acted as Editor in Chief. The then unknown Srđan Dedić playing the piano and synthesizer as guest musician. Almost all the lyrics and music were written by Slamnig. Only the lyrics for "Dječačići" were coauthored by Furlan, and the music for "Samo da te malo" by Mandić. The album became one of the lost masterpieces of Zagreb music from the so-called New Wave era.

Slamnig played in the band Dee Dee Mellow for a while, while the group was dissolving slowly after publishing a single audio-cassette.

Slamnig wrote the score for the popular TV-show Blentoni, and his song "Frida" was recorded by Psihomodo Pop.

Today Slamnig is a member of the band Psi od Slame (Straw Dogs) with another veteran "gray eminence" of the New Wave era, the musician and theatre-person Pjer Žardin. Up to this day the band has released no official recordings apart from those available at their Internet site.

Other activities

Slamnig created and recorded some jingles for the Zagreb Radio 101 as well as answering machine messages. He also did some programming. His Another MasterMind for Windows is one of the more witted version of the game adapted for computers.

Recordings

 Mira Furlan i Orkestar Davora Slamniga (1982)

Participated on:
 Buldožer: Izlog jeftinih slatkiša'' (1980)

Books

 "Čudovište" (1980), short story collection
 "Qwertzu i Opš" (1983), short story collection
 "Topli zrak" (2002), novel
 "Krumpirova rodbina" (2005), short story collection

Awards

 First Prize of Jutarnji list, 2002, for the novel "Topli zrak"
 Second Prize of Večernji list, 2004, for the short story "Teletabisi"
 Prize Ranko Marinković, Prize of Večernji list, 2006, for the short story "Kak smo postali Dalmatinci"

Notes

External links
 Davor Slamnig

1956 births
Musicians from Zagreb
Croatian male short story writers
Croatian short story writers
Croatian male writers
Writers from Zagreb
Living people
University of Zagreb alumni